David Joseph Callahan (July 20, 1888 – October 28, 1969) was a Major League Baseball outfielder who played for two seasons. He played for the Cleveland Naps from 1910 to 1911.

Career
Callahan made his debut for the Naps around the same time as a young Shoeless Joe Jackson. Cleveland's manager, Jimmy McAleer, seemed more hopeful about Callahan's prospects, saying that Callahan was the best outfielder to arrive in Cleveland in a decade. Callahan spent two years with the team, but he played in only 19 games before leaving the major leagues in 1911.

References

External links

1888 births
1969 deaths
Cleveland Naps players
Major League Baseball outfielders
Kewanee Boilermakers players
Springfield Senators players
Eau Claire Commissioners players
Toledo Mud Hens players
New Orleans Pelicans (baseball) players
Atlanta Crackers players
Nashville Vols players
Louisville Colonels (minor league) players
Scranton Miners players
Galveston Pirates players
Dallas Giants players
Dallas Marines players
Shreveport Gassers players
Bloomington Bloomers players
Peoria Tractors players
Danville Veterans players
Baseball players from Illinois
People from Seneca, Illinois